Gašper Koritnik (born 6 January 2001) is a Slovenian football player who plays as forward for the Slovenian PrvaLiga club Celje.

References

2001 births
Living people
Slovenian footballers
Slovenia youth international footballers
Association football forwards
Slovenian PrvaLiga players
NK Krško players
NK Celje players
People from Trbovlje